Ayyappanmudi is a Hindu temple located in Kallad at Kothamangalam in the Ernakulam District of Kerala, India. It is dedicated to the Hindu deity Ayyappan.

Location
The temple is situated at the summit of Mount Ayyappan. The main attraction is a rock that is balanced at the top of the hill.

Opening times
The temple is open only on the first Saturday of every month of the Malayalam calendar.

Gallery

References

Hindu temples in Ernakulam district